Atenguillo   is a town and municipality, in Jalisco in central-western Mexico. The municipality covers an area of  662.55 km².

As of 2005, the municipality had a population of 4107.

References

Municipalities of Jalisco